"Meanwhile" is a song written by Wayland Holyfield and J. Fred Knobloch, and performed by American country music artist George Strait.  It was released in January 1999 as the first single to his album Always Never the Same.  It peaked at number 4 on the United States Billboard Hot Country Singles & Tracks chart, while it was a number-one hit on the Canadian RPM Country Tracks chart. It also peaked at number 38 on the U.S. Billboard Hot 100, marking his first Top 40 hit on that chart.

Critical reception
Deborah Evans Price, of Billboard magazine reviewed the song favorably, calling it a "lilting ballad". She goes on to say that "Strait's voice sounds like he's lived every word — the pleasure, the nostalgia, the wistful longing".

Chart positions
"Meanwhile" debuted at number 57 on the U.S. Billboard Hot Country Singles & Tracks for the week of January 9, 1999.

Year-end charts

References

1999 singles
George Strait songs
Song recordings produced by Tony Brown (record producer)
Songs written by Wayland Holyfield
Songs written by J. Fred Knobloch
MCA Records singles
1998 songs